Terence Patrick Bourke, 10th Earl of Mayo (26 August 1929 – 22 September 2006) spent much of his life in England, before moving to Ireland and finally France. He was a pilot in the Fleet Air Arm, ran a printing company, stood for parliament, managed a marble quarrying company in Ireland, and finally bred deer in south-west France.

Early life
Bourke was born in Gosforth, Northumbria, the son of the Hon. Bryan Longley Bourke, third son of Walter Longley Bourke, 8th Earl of Mayo. He was educated at St. Aubyns Preparatory School in Rottingdean and then at the Dartmouth Royal Naval College, as a cadet. He was commissioned into the Royal Navy and joined the Fleet Air Arm, flying Sea Hawks in the Suez Crisis of 1956.  He later flew aerobatics with No. 703 Naval Air Squadron and left the Navy on medical grounds in 1959.

Career
Bourke set up a printing company in Gosport, Hampshire, where he became active in local politics, serving as a Conservative councillor from 1961 to 1964.  In 1962 he inherited his titles from an uncle, Ulick Henry Bourke, 9th Earl of Mayo.  However, his Irish peerages (Earl of Mayo, Viscount Mayo of Monycrower, and Lord Naas) only entitled him to sit in the Irish House of Lords, which had been abolished under the Acts of Union 1800.  He stood for Parliament as a Liberal candidate in South Dorset in the 1964 general election, but lost heavily to the Conservative candidate.

In 1965, he moved to County Galway in the Republic of Ireland, where he became managing director of the Irish Marble Company, quarrying Connemara marble.  He also founded the Galway Flying Club, which later led to the creation of Galway airport.

Family
In 1952, Bourke married firstly Margaret Jane Robinson Harrison. They had three sons, but were divorced in 1987. The same year, he married secondly Sally Anne Matthews. With his second wife and their son, he moved to a chateau in the south-west of France, where he bred deer.

Mayo died in 2006 and was buried at Mondebat in the French département of Gers.

He was succeeded to his titles by his eldest son, Charles Bourke, 11th Earl of Mayo.

Arms

References

1929 births
2006 deaths
British military personnel of the Suez Crisis
Royal Navy officers
Fleet Air Arm aviators
People from Gosforth
Terence
Earls of Mayo
Military personnel from Newcastle upon Tyne